Shabunda is a town and a territory of South Kivu in the Democratic Republic of the Congo. Shabunda is the largest territory in the province, covering more than 25,000 square kilometres. 

According to the Humanitarian Exchange Magazine, in 2002 it was "home to over a million people. The administrative centre, Shabunda, is nearly 3,000 km from the capital, Kinshasa. There are no postal services and no radio. Only landing strips keep the territory from being completely cut off".. It is possible to access Shabunda by motorbike from Kindu but it is a two day trip.

In June 1997 reports surfaced of a massacre of refugees in February that year at a bridge over the Ulindi River just north of the town of Shabunda. The refugees included unarmed civilians and armed Hutu fighters who had been involved in the 1994 massacre of Tutsis in Rwanda. They were attacked by Rwandan Tutsi troops who were fighting with the rebel forces of Laurent Kabila to overthrow the dictator Mobutu Sese Seko.
Witnesses said that hundreds of people were killed.

In 2022 water supply was established in the centre of Shabunda. There had been no water supply there for 100 years.

Politics
Shabunda Territory is represented in the National Assembly by two deputies:
Benjamin Mukulungu (PPPD)
Mwenebantu Amuri (NAD)

References

Territories of South Kivu Province